Mount Pleasant Airport may refer to:
				
Mount Pleasant Airport (Utah) in Mount Pleasant, Utah, United States (FAA: 43U)
Mount Pleasant Regional Airport (South Carolina) in Mount Pleasant, South Carolina, United States (FAA: LRO)
Mount Pleasant Regional Airport (Texas) in Mount Pleasant, Texas, United States (FAA: OSA)
Mount Pleasant/Scottdale Airport in Mount Pleasant, Pennsylvania, United States (FAA: P45)
RAF Mount Pleasant, a military base for the Royal Air Force in the British Overseas Territory of the Falkland Islands (IATA: MPN)
RCAF Station Mount Pleasant, a Second World War British Commonwealth Air Training Plan (BCATP) station located at Mount Pleasant, Prince Edward Island, Canada

See also
Mount Pleasant Municipal Airport (disambiguation)
Mount Pleasant Regional Airport (disambiguation)